A small satellite, miniaturized satellite, or smallsat is a satellite of low mass and size, usually under . While all such satellites can be referred to as "small", different classifications are used to categorize them based on mass. Satellites can be built small to reduce the large economic cost of launch vehicles and the costs associated with construction.  Miniature satellites, especially in large numbers, may be more useful than fewer, larger ones for some purposes – for example, gathering of scientific data and radio relay.  Technical challenges in the construction of small satellites may include the lack of sufficient power storage or of room for a propulsion system.

Rationales 

One rationale for miniaturizing satellites is to reduce the cost; heavier satellites require larger rockets with greater thrust that also have greater cost to finance. In contrast, smaller and lighter satellites require smaller and cheaper launch vehicles and can sometimes be launched in multiples. They can also be launched 'piggyback', using excess capacity on larger launch vehicles. Miniaturized satellites allow for cheaper designs and ease of mass production.

Another major reason for developing small satellites is the opportunity to enable missions that a larger satellite could not accomplish, such as:
 Constellations for low data rate communications
 Using formations to gather data from multiple points
 In-orbit inspection of larger satellites
 University-related research
 Testing or qualifying new hardware before using it on a more expensive spacecraft

History 
The nanosatellite and microsatellite segments of the satellite launch industry have been growing rapidly in recent years. Development activity in the  range has been significantly exceeding that in the  range.

In the  range alone, fewer than 15 satellites were launched annually in 2000 to 2005, 34 in 2006, then fewer than 30 launches annually during 2007 to 2011.  This rose to 34 launched in 2012 and 92 launched in 2013.

By mid-2015, many more launch options had become available for smallsats, and rides as secondary payloads had become both greater in quantity and easier to schedule on shorter notice.

In a surprising turn of events, the U.S. Department of Defense, which has for decades procured heavy satellites on decade-long procurement cycles, is making a transition to smallsats in the 2020s. The office of space acquisition and integration said in January 2023 that "the era of massive satellites needs to be in the rear view mirror for the Department of Defense" with small satellites being procured for DoD needs in all orbital regimes, regardless of "whether it’s LEO MEO or GEO" while aiming for procurements in under three years.  The smaller satellites are deemed to be harder for an enemy to target, as well as providing more resilience through redundancy in the design of a large distributed network of satellite assets.

Classification groups

Small satellites 

Small satellite examples include Demeter, Essaim, Parasol, Picard, MICROSCOPE, TARANIS, ELISA, SSOT, SMART-1, Spirale-A and -B, and Starlink satellites.

Small satellite launch vehicle 
Although smallsats have traditionally been launched as secondary payloads on larger launch vehicles,  a number of companies currently are developing or have developed launch vehicles specifically targeted at the smallsat market. In particular, the secondary payload paradigm does not provide the specificity required for many small satellites that have unique orbital and launch-timing requirements.

Companies offering smallsat launch vehicles include:
Rocket Lab's Electron (300 kg)
Virgin Orbit's LauncherOne (500 kg)
Astra's Rocket 3.3 (100 kg)
Vaya Space's Dauntless (1000+ kg LEO 600+ kg SSO)

Microsatellites 
However, this is not an official convention and sometimes those terms can refer to satellites larger than that, or smaller than that (e.g.). Sometimes, designs or proposed designs from some satellites of these types have microsatellites working together or in a formation. The generic term "small satellite" or "smallsat" is also sometimes used, as is "satlet".

Examples: Astrid-1 and Astrid-2, as well as the set of satellites currently announced for LauncherOne (below)

In 2018, the two Mars Cube One microsats—massing just  each—became the first CubeSats to leave Earth orbit for use in interplanetary space.  They flew on their way to Mars alongside the successful Mars InSight lander mission.
The two microsats accomplished a flyby of Mars in November 2018, and both continued communicating with ground stations on Earth through late December.  Both went silent by early January 2019.

Microsatellite launch vehicle 
A number of commercial and military-contractor companies are currently developing microsatellite launch vehicles to perform the increasingly targeted launch requirements of microsatellites.  While microsatellites have been carried to space for many years as secondary payloads aboard larger launchers, the secondary payload paradigm does not provide the specificity required for many increasingly sophisticated small satellites that have unique orbital and launch-timing requirements.

In July 2012, Virgin Galactic announced LauncherOne, an orbital launch vehicle designed to launch "smallsat" primary payloads of  into low Earth orbit, with launches projected to begin in 2016. Several commercial customers have already contracted for launches, including GeoOptics, Skybox Imaging, Spaceflight Industries, and Planetary Resources. Both Surrey Satellite Technology and Sierra Nevada Space Systems are developing satellite buses "optimized to the design of LauncherOne".

In December 2012, DARPA announced that the Airborne Launch Assist Space Access program would provide the microsatellite rocket booster for the DARPA SeeMe program that intended to release a "constellation of 24 micro-satellites (~ range) each with 1-m imaging resolution."  The program was cancelled in December 2015.

In April 2013, Garvey Spacecraft was awarded a  contract to evolve their Prospector 18 suborbital launch vehicle technology into an orbital nanosat launch vehicle capable of delivering a  payload into a  orbit to an even-more-capable clustered "20/450 Nano/Micro Satellite Launch Vehicle" (NMSLV) capable of delivering  payloads into  circular orbits.

The Boeing Small Launch Vehicle is an air-launched three-stage-to-orbit launch vehicle concept aimed to launch small payloads of  into low Earth orbit.

The Swiss company Swiss Space Systems (S3) has announced plans in 2013 to develop a suborbital spaceplane named SOAR that would launch a microsat launch vehicle capable of putting a payload of up to  into low Earth orbit.

The Spanish company PLD Space born in 2011 with the objective of developing low cost launch vehicles called Miura 1 and Miura 5 with the capacity to place up to  into orbit.

Nanosatellites 

Designs and proposed designs of these types may be launched individually, or they may have multiple nanosatellites working together or in formation, in which case, sometimes the term "satellite swarm" or "fractionated spacecraft" may be applied. Some designs require a larger "mother" satellite for communication with ground controllers or for launching and docking with nanosatellites. Over 1600 nanosatellites have been launched as of August 2021.

The CubeSat concept was first developed in 1999 by a collaborative team of California Polytechnic State University and Stanford University, and the specifications, for use by anyone planning to launch a CubeSat-style nanosatellite, are maintained by this group.

With continued advances in the miniaturization and capability increase of electronic technology and the use of satellite constellations, nanosatellites are increasingly capable of performing commercial missions that previously required microsatellites.
For example, a 6U CubeSat standard has been proposed to enable a satellite constellation of thirty five  Earth-imaging satellites to replace a constellation of five  RapidEye Earth-imaging satellites, at the same mission cost, with significantly increased revisit times: every area of the globe can be imaged every 3.5 hours rather than the once per 24 hours with the RapidEye constellation. More rapid revisit times are a significant improvement for nations performing disaster response, which was the purpose of the RapidEye constellation. Additionally, the nanosat option would allow more nations to own their own satellite for off-peak (non-disaster) imaging data collection. As costs lower and production times shorten, nanosatellites are becoming increasingly feasible ventures for companies.

Example nanosatellites: ExoCube (CP-10), ArduSat, SPROUT

Nanosatellite developers and manufacturers include EnduroSat, GomSpace, NanoAvionics, NanoSpace, Spire, Surrey Satellite Technology, NovaWurks, Dauria Aerospace, Planet Labs and Reaktor.

Nanosat market 
In the ten years of nanosat launches prior to 2014, only 75 nanosats were launched. Launch rates picked up substantially when in the three-month period from November 2013–January 2014 94 nanosats were launched.

One challenge of using nanosats has been the economic delivery of such small satellites to anywhere beyond low Earth orbit. By late 2014, proposals were being developed for larger spacecraft specifically designed to deliver swarms of nanosats to trajectories that are beyond Earth orbit for applications such as exploring distant asteroids.

Nanosatellite launch vehicle 
With the emergence of the technological advances of miniaturization and increased capital to support private spaceflight initiatives in the 2010s, several startups have been formed to pursue opportunities with developing a variety of small-payload Nanosatellite Launch Vehicle (NLV) technologies.

NLVs proposed or under development include:
 Virgin Orbit LauncherOne upper stage, intended to be air-launched from WhiteKnightTwo similar to how the SpaceShipTwo spaceplane is launched.
 Ventions' Nanosat upper stage.
 Nammo/Andøya North Star (polar orbit-capable launcher for a  payload)
 , Garvey Spacecraft (now Vector Launch) is evolving their Prospector 18 suborbital launch vehicle technology into an orbital nanosat launch vehicle capable of delivering a  payload into a  orbit.
 Generation Orbit is developing an air-launched rocket to deliver both nanosats and  microsats to low Earth orbit.

Actual NS launches:
 NASA launched three satellites on 21 April 2013 based on smart phones. Two phones use the PhoneSat 1.0 specification and the third used a beta version of PhoneSat 2.0
 ISRO launched 14 nanosatellites on 22 June 2016, 2 for Indian universities and 12 for the United States under the Flock-2P program. This launch was performed during the PSLV-C34 mission.
 ISRO launched 103 nanosatellites on 15 February 2017. This launch was performed during the PSLV-C37 mission.

Picosatellites 
Again, designs and proposed designs of these types usually have multiple picosatellites working together or in formation (sometimes the term "swarm" is applied). Some designs require a larger "mother" satellite for communication with ground controllers or for launching and docking with picosatellites.

Picosatellites are emerging as a new alternative for do-it-yourself kitbuilders. Launch opportunities are now available for $12,000 to $18,000 for sub-1 kg picosat payloads that are approximately the size of a soda can.

Femtosatellites 
The term "femtosatellite" or "femtosat" is usually applied to artificial satellites with a wet mass below . Like picosatellites, some designs require a larger "mother" satellite for communication with ground controllers.

They were attached to the ISS external platform Materials International Space Station Experiment (MISSE-8) for testing. In April 2014, the nanosatellite KickSat was launched aboard a Falcon 9 rocket with the intention of releasing 104 femtosatellite-sized chipsats, or "Sprites". In the event, they were unable to complete the deployment on time due to a failure of an onboard clock and the deployment mechanism reentered the atmosphere on 14 May 2014, without having deployed any of the  femtosats.
ThumbSat is another project intending to launch femtosatellites in the late 2010s.  ThumbSat announced a launch agreement with CubeCat in 2017 to launch up to 1000 of the very small satellites.

In March 2019, the CubeSat KickSat-2 deployed 105 femtosats called "ChipSats" into Earth orbit. Each of the ChipSats weighed 4 grams. The satellites were tested for 3 days, and they then reentered the atmosphere and burned up.

Technical challenges 

Small satellites usually require innovative propulsion, attitude control, communication and computation systems.

Larger satellites usually use monopropellants or bipropellant combustion systems for propulsion and attitude control; these systems are complex and require a minimal amount of volume to surface area to dissipate heat. These systems may be used on larger small satellites, while other micro/nanosats have to use electric propulsion, compressed gas, vaporizable liquids such as butane or carbon dioxide or other innovative propulsion systems that are simple, cheap and scalable.

Small satellites can use conventional radio systems in UHF, VHF, S-band and X-band, although often miniaturized using more up-to-date technology as compared to larger satellites. Tiny satellites such as nanosats and small microsats may lack the power supply or mass for large conventional radio transponders, and various miniaturized or innovative communications systems have been proposed, such as laser receivers, antenna arrays and satellite-to-satellite communication networks. Few of these have been demonstrated in practice.

Electronics need to be rigorously tested and modified to be "space hardened" or resistant to the outer space environment (vacuum, microgravity, thermal extremes, and radiation exposure). Miniaturized satellites allow for the opportunity to test new hardware with reduced expense in testing. Furthermore, since the overall cost risk in the mission is much lower, more up-to-date but less space-proven technology can be incorporated into micro and nanosats than can be used in much larger, more expensive missions with less appetite for risk.

Collision safety 

Small satellites are difficult to track with ground-based radar, so it is difficult to predict if they will collide with other satellites or human-occupied spacecraft.  The U.S. Federal Communications Commission has rejected at least one small satellite launch request on these safety grounds.

See also 

 Canadian Advanced Nanospace eXperiment Program
 CanSat
 DRAGONSat picosatellite
 Micro air vehicle
 N-Prize
 Nanosatellite Launch System
 Satellite formation flying
 SPHERES
 Student Space Exploration & Technology Initiative
 University Nanosatellite Program
 AMSAT Amateur Satellite Corp.
 PocketQube
 Rocket Lab

References

External links 
Nanosatellite and CubeSat Database
NewSpace Index
Pico Satellite Development Resources

Satellites by type